Theophilus Fortescue (1707–1746), of Castle Hill, Filleigh, near Barnstaple, Devon, was a British Whig politician who sat in the House of Commons from 1727 to 1746.

Fortescue was the third son of Hugh Fortescue, MP of Filleigh and his first wife Bridget Boscawen, daughter of Hugh Boscawen of Tregothnan, Cornwall.
 
Fortescue was returned unopposed as an opposition Whig Member of Parliament for Barnstaple on his family's interest at the 1727 British general election. He voted against the Administration in almost every division. He was returned for Barnstaple unopposed again at the  1734 British general election. At the 1741 British general election  he transferred to Devon where he was returned unopposed.

Fortescue died unmarried on 13 March 1746.

References

1707 births
1746 deaths
Members of the Parliament of Great Britain for Barnstaple
British MPs 1727–1734
British MPs 1734–1741
British MPs 1741–1747
Members of the Parliament of Great Britain for Devon